Théophile Phillippe Barakat (1 July 1952 – 13 June 2020) was a Syriac Catholic archeparch.

Barakat was born in Syria and was ordained to the priesthood in 1976. He was the Syriac Catholic archeparch of the Syriac Catholic Archeparchy of Homs in 2016.

He died on 13 June 2020.

References
 

1952 births
2020 deaths
Syriac Catholic bishops